Although tennis has long been on the list of approved optional Commonwealth Games sports, and has featured in every Commonwealth Youth Games programme, it made its maiden appearance in a full Commonwealth Games programme at the 2010 Commonwealth Games.

The tennis events were held from 4–10 October 2010, which clashed with the dates of the China Open, an ATP World Tour 500 and WTA Tour Premier Mandatory event. Despite initial concerns that governing bodies would fail to persuade their top players to compete in Delhi, several top tennis players competed for their countries, including Mahesh Bhupathi (India),  Peter Luczak (Australia), Sania Mirza (India), Jamie Murray (Scotland), Leander Paes (India), and Anastasia Rodionova (Australia).

Notable top players Lleyton Hewitt (Australia) did not compete for his country, as he was concerned about security problems and losing ATP ranking points. Andy Murray (Scotland) and Samantha Stosur (Australia) were also absent.

Stosur specifically decided not to compete in the games for she was to take part in the tournament in Beijing (Premier Mandatory) and Osaka (to defend her title).

The deadline for submission of named players was 3 September 2010.


Medal table

Venue 

 R.K. Khanna Tennis Complex

Training venues
 Siri Fort Sports Complex - 9 courts
 RK Khanna Tennis Stadium - 6 courts

Medallists

Participating nations 
A total of 23 nations were represented by at least one player in either the men's singles, women's singles, men's doubles, women's doubles, or mixed doubles.

Number in brackets = players participating only in doubles

References

 
2010
Commonwealth Games
Tennis tournaments in India